The Sorel-Tracy Éperviers (Sorel-Tracy Hawks) are a professional ice hockey team based in Sorel-Tracy, Quebec. The team is part of the Ligue Nord-Américaine de Hockey (LNAH). The Éperviers play at the Colisée Cardin.

Initially, the team was based in Saint-Gabriel, Quebec and was called the Blizzard. Its first season was the 1996–97 season, where they captured the Futura Cup. The team then moved to Joliette, Quebec in 1998. It changed its name from Blizzard to Mission before the 2000–01 season. During its time in Joliette, they won a further two Futura Cups in 1998-99 and 2000–01. Before the 2002–03 season, they moved to Saint-Jean-sur-Richelieu, Quebec. They played two season there, before they moved to Sorel-Tracy before the 2004–05 season.

The Sorel LNAH franchise was inactive after the 2008 season, but was officially reinstated into the league on May 21, 2010 as the Sorel-Tracy GCI, backed by new shareholders and owners, Roger Savard, owner of mining equipment manufacturer GCI Environnement, Jean-Guy Poirier, the former owner of Royal Sorel, and four players, Christian Deschênes, Gregory Dupré, Steven Low, and Jonathan Forest.

In 2011, the team changed its name to HC Carvena, after Carvena, a local cleaning and sanitation service when  GCI ended its sponsorship.

In 2013, the team decide to change its name again to Sorel-Tracy Éperviers, after the former junior team Sorel Éperviers of the Quebec Major Junior Hockey League, famous for alumni Ray Bourque.

References

External links
 Sorel-Tracy Hawks official site

Ice hockey teams in Quebec
Ligue Nord-Américaine de Hockey teams
Sport in Sorel-Tracy